Dwight Edward Helminen (born June 22, 1983) is an American former professional ice hockey center who most recently played with the Kalamazoo Wings of the ECHL. His brother Lars plays with Linz EHC of the EBEL.

Playing career
Helminen was born in Hancock, Michigan, and raised in Brighton, Michigan. As a youth, he played in the 1997 Quebec International Pee-Wee Hockey Tournament with the Detroit Compuware minor ice hockey team.

He was drafted 244th overall in the 2002 NHL Entry Draft by the Edmonton Oilers. Dwight played junior hockey for the U.S. Junior National Team in the United States Hockey League (USHL) and college hockey at the University of Michigan for the Wolverines. On March 3, 2004, the New York Rangers acquired his rights from the Oilers along with a 2004 second round draft pick and Steve Valiquette in exchange for Petr Nedvěd and Jussi Markkanen.

Since turning professional, Helminen has played for the Charlotte Checkers in the ECHL and the Hartford Wolf Pack in the American Hockey League (AHL), before signing with JYP Jyväskylä in the Finnish SM-liiga in 2007.

Helminen signed a one-year contract with the Carolina Hurricanes on July 3, 2008. He was then assigned to the Hurricanes' affiliate, the Albany River Rats of the AHL. Helminen made his NHL debut in the 2008–09 season after an injury to Brandon Sutter. He played in 23 regular season games by season's end with the Hurricanes, as well as one playoff game.

On July 16, 2009, Helminen signed a one-year contract with the San Jose Sharks. In the 2009–10 season, on February 11, 2010, Helminen scored his first goal with the Sharks, against the Detroit Red Wings. On April 22, 2010, he scored a goal against the Colorado Avalanche in the Sharks' first-round playoff series.

Midway through the 2011–12 season, Helminen left KLH Chomutov of the Czech first division league to return to North America, signing with the Kalamazoo Wings of the ECHL on February 6, 2012.

Career statistics

Regular season and playoffs

International

Awards and honors

References

External links
 

1983 births
Living people
Albany River Rats players
American men's ice hockey centers
American people of Finnish descent
Carolina Hurricanes players
Charlotte Checkers (1993–2010) players
Edmonton Oilers draft picks
Hartford Wolf Pack players
Ice hockey players from Michigan
JYP Jyväskylä players
Kalamazoo Wings (ECHL) players
Michigan Wolverines men's ice hockey players
Lahti Pelicans players
People from Hancock, Michigan
People from Brighton, Michigan
San Jose Sharks players
Sportspeople from Metro Detroit
USA Hockey National Team Development Program players
Worcester Sharks players